Weymouth Football Club is an English semi-professional football club based in the town of Weymouth, Dorset. They compete in the National League South, the sixth tier of the English football league system. Nicknamed the Terras due to their terracotta strip, they play their home matches at the Bob Lucas Stadium. The club is affiliated to the Dorset County Football Association and is an FA chartered Standard club.

History

Weymouth Football Club was founded on the 26th of August 1890 and played their first fixture on the 24th of September v a Mr Popes XI at Lodmoor, winning 2-0. In 1886 they were one of the founding members of the Dorset League, finishing 3rd in its inaugural season. In the following 1897-98 season, they took a lease at the Recreation Ground, which would be their home for 89 years, and enjoyed success with their first Dorset League title. They continued as a continued member of the Dorset League over the next 20 years, winning a further league title in the 1913-14 season, shortly before the league was suspended due to the outbreak of the First World War.

Following the resumption of football, Weymouth were elected to join the Western League from the 1921-22 season, where they competed as well as continuing in the Dorset League. Following a Dorset League win that season, they followed it up in the 22-23 season with a Western League, Dorset League and Dorset Senior Cup Treble. The following year the club turned professional, and were elected to the Southern League for the first time.

Early years (1890–1939) 
Weymouth Football Club were founded in 1890 and played their first game on 24 September. After thrice-winning the Dorset Junior Cup, they helped found the Dorset League. Weymouth joined the Western League in 1907–08, embracing full-time professionalism following their 1923 win and joining the Southern League. However, by 1928–29, debts had mounted and the club withdrew, resuming as an amateur club. They climbed back up the table and reached the Premier League and then folded for five years and reformed.

1939–1987
The Weymouth Recreation Ground was requisitioned in 1939 due to the Second World War—football only resumed in 1947 when the club reformed semi-professionally. Soon achieving promotion back into the Southern League, they were champions in the 1964–65 and 1965–66 seasons. They share the distinction of playing all twenty seasons in the Premier Division prior to league re-organisation with Telford United and Yeovil.

On 28 February 1967, Weymouth player Dick Keith, who had played in the 1958 World Cup for Northern Ireland, was killed in a building site accident.

1987–2006
On 21 October 1987, the club moved to the new Wessex Stadium with the opening match against Manchester United ending with Weymouth winning 1–0 following an unveiling by Ron Greenwood. After initial success, the club slumped following relegation from the Conference, and continued to see-saw between the Premier and Southern divisions of the Southern League.

Ian Ridley took control of the club in 2003, bringing new optimism when he appointed former Weymouth and Leicester City player, Steve Claridge, manager. Within a season, the club had gone from near-relegation to near-promotion and gate receipts had increased from 500 to 1,200. With Martyn Harrison's arrival on the board, he decided to place the club under his company Hollybush Hotels and began to interfere in playing matters. This prompted Ridley to leave in September 2004, followed by Claridge sacking Harrison weeks later. Harrison had planned to appoint Steve Johnson—the brother of Gary Johnson—as manager in November, prompting a huge turnover in players. As the team dropped down the league, Harrison sacked Johnson in March 2005, with Garry Hill taking over. An automatic promotion to the Conference came with large loans from Harrison to meet increasing wage bills of around £20,000 a week and a full-time regime.

Financial turmoil (2007–2011) 
In January 2007, Harrison announced that in order to guarantee the long-term financial future of the club, the entire first team had been transfer listed, and the management team of Hill and Kevin Hales had left the club by mutual consent. Days later, it was announced that Tindall had been appointed player-manager, with Roy O'Brien appointed player-coach, and the squad had been taken off the transfer list.

They finished 11th in the Conference National in 2006–07. On 20 June 2007, Mel Bush was confirmed as the club's new owner. Tindall was sacked in January 2008 after 12 months in charge, in light of a 2007–08 season record of only three wins, leaving the club in 19th, five points off of the relegation zone. John Hollins was officially confirmed as the club's new manager a day later. He guided the club to an 18th-place finish in the 2007–08 season.

In close season 2008, the club started a rebranding programme, with the club badge changing, and a club motto being introduced, "Forward Together". Then the announcement of local children's hospice Julia's House as the shirt sponsor for the year.

On 21 October 2008, club owner Malcolm Curtis announced he was set to step down and look to sell the club. The following month Hollins was suspended and ultimately sacked for what the club described as an "unprofessional attitude" on his part, with assistant Alan Lewer stepping up to the manager's role.

At the start of 2009, it was announced that Weymouth were in financial difficulties. It is suspected that Weymouth were £30,000 in debt and on 19 January 2009, Chief Executive Gary Calder announced that Malcolm Curtis had resigned as a Director and as Chairman of Weymouth Football Club Ltd.

The ousted former chairman, Ian Ridley, made a surprise return to the chair on 18 March 2009. This was followed days later by the sacking of Alan Lewer. He was replaced by Bobby Gould, the former manager of Wales. Despite his experience, Gould was unable to turn the situation around and the club were relegated.

On 20 May 2009, the club hired former Terras player, Matty Hale, as their new manager. 

On 10 October, after a 5–0 defeat against Maidenhead United and a string of bad results that left the club bottom of the Conference South manager Matty Hale handed in his resignation. A day later it was announced assistant manager Ian Hutchinson would take over on a caretaker basis. It was then announced that the chairman and chief executive Ian Ridley & Dave Higson would be leaving the club because of ill health and work commitments.

On 26 October 2009, Paul Cocks, a director at the club, announced the following:
"Weymouth Football Club regrets to announce that Notice of Intention to Appoint Administrators was filed at The Courts of Justice, London earlier today. The Board is now working with the proposed firm of Administrators and the Terras Supporters Trust to try to find a way to enable the Football Club to remain in existence. The Club is now losing money on a week-to-week basis and without financial support from outside the Club it is unlikely the Administrators will be prepared to enable the Club to continue to trade in order to avoid increasing losses to creditors. Anyone interested in assisting the Club or acquiring the Club out of administration is encouraged to make contact with the agents acting: Benedict Mackenzie 62 Wilson Street London EC2A 2BU without delay. Every day is critical."

In November 2009, former Cambridge United chairman, George Rolls made a successful bid for the club and became the new owner. Part of this deal saw manager Ian Hutchinson stay on until the end of the season. But after Hutchinson claimed just eight points from a possible 30, Rolls decided to sack Hutchinson and his assistant Andy Mason on 17 January 2010.

On 27 January 2010, Jerry Gill was named as the new manager, signing a contract until April 2011. In March 2010 chairman George Rolls applied Weymouth Football Club for a CVA (Company Voluntary Agreement) because of the £822,000 debt at the club. On 11 March, Jerry Gill resigned as manager after just 44 days in the job.

In March 2010, Weymouth chairman George Rolls announced that if their proposed Company Voluntary Arrangement is not accepted then the club could go into liquidation. The CVA was accepted on 26 March, saving the club from extinction.  However, the club were relegated on 5 April after a 2–1 home defeat by relegation rivals Weston-super-Mare.

On 14 April 2010, it was announced that Ian Hutchinson had returned as manager with assistant Andy Mason joining him on a two-year contracts at the start of the 2010–11 season.

In July 2010, chairman George Rolls elected to change the stadium name in honour of 85-year-old club president Bob Lucas, who was suffering from cancer. He died on 12 August.

On 12 January 2011, with Weymouth bottom of the Southern League Premier Division, Rolls sacked Hutchinson once again after a meeting with the clubs associate directors. In January 2011 Rolls hired Martyn Rogers to help the club avoid a third straight relegation, which was eventually successful.

2012 takeover and Trust ownership
In February 2012, club director and lifelong fan Nigel Biddelcombe completed a takeover of the club from George Rolls, whose controversial reign at the Bob Lucas Stadium ended with his move to another club in deep financial turmoil, in Kettering Town.

Biddlecombe and his board set up a trust which would mean no one person would ever be able to have total control of the club again. The shares Nigel, members of the board and most other shares bought over the years were officially transferred into the Trust before the Terras home game with Frome Town on Easter Monday.

Weymouth finished 17th in the Southern League Premier Division in 2011–12. They had looked safe for much of the season but a downturn in form saw the Terras only secure safety on the penultimate day of the season with a 2–1 victory at home to Hitchin Town. That season the Terras also made it to the FA Trophy second round proper. After beating Chippenham Town 2–1 in round one, the Terras slumped to a 6–0 home defeat against Conference National side Alfreton Town.

2018–present
Following reorganisation of the Southern League for the 2018–19 season, Weymouth finished the season in first place of the Southern League Premier Division South, to secure promotion to the National League South. The subsequent champions' play-off with Kettering Town ended in a 1–1 draw. Weymouth won the penalty shoot out 5–3, to be crowned overall Southern League Premier champions.

Weymouth finished the 2019–20 season in 3rd place and on 1 August 2020, they were promoted to the National League after a play-off Final win against Dartford. The club were relegated back to the National League South in the 2021–22 season, relegation confirmed with four matches left after a 6–1 home thrashing by Wrexham.

FA Cup history
Weymouth have enjoyed considerable FA Cup success since first entering in 1893–94. They first reached the national stages in 1905–06 when they lost 12–1 to Gainsborough Trinity. In 1949 they lost 4–0 at Maine Road (as Old Trafford was being rebuilt) to Manchester United in the Third round, then in 1962 they reached the Fourth round where they lost 2–0 at Deepdale to Preston North End. In 2005, the team held former European Champions Nottingham Forest to a 1–1 draw at the City Ground, before losing 2–0 in the replay. In the 2006–07 FA Cup, Weymouth held Bury to a 2–2 draw at home, in front of BBC cameras in what would be the first ever match to be broadcast live on free to air television at Weymouth.

Rivals
Historically, Weymouth had their strongest rivalry with Yeovil Town, However, the rivalry has dwindled slightly over the past decade due to the lack of competitive meetings between Weymouth and Yeovil. Bath City were also considered rivals. 

However, the relegation of the Terras from the National League in the 2021–22 season, means that both Weymouth and Bath now participate in the National League South as of the 2022–23 season, the last time being the 2009–10 season. Yeovil's subsequent decline since 2014 has re-sparked the historic feud between the two clubs. Many Terras fans consider Yeovil Town to be the clubs biggest rival.

Recent seasons
Below is Weymouth's performance over the last 5 seasons, for a full history see: List of Weymouth F.C. seasons

Current squad

Coaching staff

Managers
  Tommy Morris (1907–1914 and 1919–1922)
  Billy Walker (1924–1926)
  Billy Kingdon (1947–1948)
  Paddy Gallagher (July 1948 – 1950)
  Jack Taylor (June 1950 – 1952)
  Willie Fagan (July 1952 – 1955)
  Arthur Coles (1955–1961)
  Frank O'Farrell (June 1961 – May 1965)
  Stan Charlton (July 1965 – May 1972)
  Graham Williams (1972–1974)
  Dietmar Bruck (1974 – Jan 1977)
  Graham Carr (1977–1978)
  Stuart Morgan (Nov 1978 – Nov 1983)
  Brian Godfrey (1978–1987)
  Stuart Morgan (1987 – Jan 1989)
  Gerry Gow (1989 – April 1990)
  Paul Compton (1990 – Dec 1990)
  Len Drake (1991 – Oct 1992)
  Len Ashurst (Dec 1992 – April 1993)
  Bill Coldwell (April 1993 – Sept 1994)
  Trevor Senior (Jan 1995 – April 1995)
  Graham Carr (May 1995 – Sept 1995)
  Matt McGowan (Sept 1995 – July 1997)
  Neil Webb (July 1997 – Sept 1997)
  John Crabbe (Sept 1997 – Dec 1997)
  Fred Davies (Dec 1997 – Oct 1999)
  Andy Mason (Oct 1999 – May 2002)
  Geoff Butler (May 2002 – May 2003)
  Steve Claridge (June 2003 – Oct 2004)
  Steve Johnson (Nov 2004 – March 2005)
  Garry Hill (March 2005 – Jan 2007)
  Jason Tindall (Jan 2007 – Jan 2008)
  John Hollins (Jan 2008 – Dec 2008)
  Alan Lewer (Dec 2008 – April 2009)
  Bobby Gould (April 2009 – April 2009)
  Matty Hale (May 2009 – October 2009)
  Ian Hutchinson (October 2009 – January 2010)
  Jerry Gill (January 2010 – March 2010)
  Andy Harris (March 2010 – April 2010)
  Ian Hutchinson (May 2010 – January 2011)
  Martyn Rogers (January 2011 – May 2011)
  Brendon King (June 2011 – December 2013)
  Jason Matthews (January 2014 – April 2017)
  Mark Molesley (April 2017 – August 2020)
  Brian Stock (September 2020 – January 2022)
  David Oldfield (January 2022 –September 2022 )
  Bobby Wilkinson (September 2022–)

Records
Best FA Cup performance: Fourth round, 1961–62
Best FA Trophy performance: Quarter-finals, 1973–74, 1976–77
Record attendance: 6,500 vs Nottingham Forest, FA Cup first round replay, 14 November 2005
Heaviest defeat: 0–9 vs Rushden & Diamonds, Conference, 21 February 2009
Most appearances: Tony Hobson, 1,076
Most goals: W Haynes, 275

Honours

League
 Southern League  (Tier 5)
Winners (2): 1964–65, 1965–66
 Conference South  (Tier 6)
Winners (1): 2005–06
Play-off winners (1): 2019-20
Southern League Premier South  (Tier 7)
Winners (1): 2018–19
Southern League Southern Division  (Tier 7)
Winners (1): 1997–98
 Western League Division One  (Tier 6)
Winners (3): 1922–23, 1936–37, 1937–38
 Western League Division Two  (Tier 7)
Winners (1): 1933–34
 Dorset League Division One: (Tier 8) 
Winners (1): 1921–22
 Dorset League: 
Winners (2): 1897–98, 1913–14

Cups
 Dorset Senior Cup 
Winners (13): 1985–86, 1986–87, 1987–88, 1990–91, 1991–92, 1993–94, 1999–2000, 2000–01, 2002–03, 2014–15, 2015–16, 2016–17, 2019–20

Notes

References

External links

 

 
Association football clubs established in 1890
National League (English football) clubs
Sport in Weymouth, Dorset
Southern Football League clubs
Football clubs in Dorset
1890 establishments in England
Football clubs in England
Dorset Football League
Companies that have entered administration in the United Kingdom